Reginald Frank Williams (12 March 1917 – 24 November 1978) was a Welsh footballer who played as a goalkeeper for Wrexham and Halifax Town in the English Football League.

Statistics
Source:

References

1917 births
1978 deaths
Sportspeople from Wrexham County Borough
Welsh footballers
Association football goalkeepers
Wrexham A.F.C. players
Halifax Town A.F.C. players
English Football League players